is a former television announcer for the NHK in Japan. He retired in 1988. He is the younger brother of film director Seijun Suzuki.

Selected works
In a statistical overview derived from writings by and about Kenji Suzuki, OCLC/WorldCat encompasses roughly 100+ works in 100+ publications in 4 languages and 200+ library holdings.

 敬語に強くなる本: 豊かな日本語への招待 (1978)
 気くばりのすすめ (1982)
 女らしさ物語 (1982)
 ビッグマン愚行錄 (1982)
 続気くばりのすすめ (1983)
 役に立つ日本史物語 (1988)
 夫婦が読む本 (1991)

References

External links
 
 NHK, Archived blog

1929 births
Living people
People from Tokyo
Japanese announcers